South Meath was a UK Parliament constituency in Ireland, returning one Member of Parliament (MP) from 1885 to 1922.

Prior to the 1885 general election the area was part of the Meath (UK Parliament constituency). From 1922, on the establishment of the Irish Free State, it was not represented in the UK Parliament.

Boundaries
This constituency comprised the southern part of County Meath.

1885–1922: The baronies of Deece Lower, Deece Upper, Duleek Lower, Duleek Upper, Dunboyne, Lune, Moyfenrath Lower, Moyfenrath Upper, Navan Upper and Ratoath, that part of the barony of Navan Lower contained within the parishes of Churchtown and Rataine, and that part of the barony of Skreen not contained within the constituency of North Meath.

Members of Parliament

Elections

Elections in the 1880s

Elections in the 1890s

On petition, Fullam was unseated causing a by-election.

Elections in the 1900s

Carew's death prompted a by-election.

Elections in the 1910s

References

Westminster constituencies in County Meath (historic)
Dáil constituencies in the Republic of Ireland (historic)
Constituencies of the Parliament of the United Kingdom established in 1885
Constituencies of the Parliament of the United Kingdom disestablished in 1922